Nanetti is an Italian surname. Notable people with the surname include:

Angela Nanetti, Italian writer active in 2019
Maria Chiara Nanetti (1872–1900), Italian nun and saint

See also
Nanette

Italian-language surnames